is a station in Ikoma City, Nara Prefecture, Japan, on the Kintetsu Ikoma Line of the Kintetsu Railway.

The name of 'Ichibu' can be found in a record written in 8th century, as a place of the residence of Prince Arima in the 7th century.

Lines 
Kintetsu
Ikoma Line

Surrounding area 
 
 Ikoma Senior High School 
 Ikoma Jinja
 Daini-Hanna Road Ichibu Slip Road
 Chikurin-ji

Adjacent stations 

Railway stations in Japan opened in 1928
Railway stations in Nara Prefecture